STEIM (STudio for Electro Instrumental Music) was a center for research and development of new musical instruments in the electronic performing arts, located in Amsterdam, Netherlands. Beginning in the 1970's, STEIM became known as a pioneering center for electronic music, where the specific context of electronic music was always strongly related to the physical and direct actions of a musician. In this tradition, STEIM supported artists in residence such as composers and performers, but also multimedia and video artists, helping them to develop setups which allowed for bespoke improvisation and performance with individually designed technology.

Background 

STEIM existed since 1969. It was founded by Misha Mengelberg, Louis Andriessen, Peter Schat, Dick Raaymakers, Jan van Vlijmen, Reinbert de Leeuw, and Konrad Boehmer. This group of Dutch composers had fought for the reformation of Amsterdam's feudal music structures; they insisted on Bruno Maderna's appointment as musical director of the Concertgebouw Orchestra and enforced the first public fundings for experimental and improvised electronic music in the Netherlands.

They were offered a budget for their collective multimedia opera "Reconstruction" which was premiered in the Holland Festival in 1969.

The technology used in this opera was then taken to Amsterdam's Prinseneiland which was STEIM's first location. Soon, in 1971, the studio moved to the Groenburgwal in the city center, where there was more space for workshops and concerts. Since 1986, STEIM was located at the Achtergracht in the city center's southern area in a building containing including three studios, a concert hall, hard and software workshops, offices, and a guesthouse for artists in residence.

STEIM officially ceased to exist as an organization at the end of 2020 due primarily to cuts within the Dutch national cultural funding system.

Selected STEIM instruments

Hardware

 Black Box System (Zwarte Dozen), by Rob van de Poel (1972)
 Eemnes Machines, by Victor Wentink (1975–79)
 Crackle Box (Kraakdoos), Crackle Synth, by Michel Waisvisz, Geert Hamelberg, Peter Beyls and Nico Bes (1975)
 The Hands, by Michel Waisvisz (since 1984). One of the world's first gestural MIDI controllers. Two wooden frames for the hands with switches, potentiometers, tilt sensors, and ultrasound.
 Hyperstring Project, by Jon Rose. Extending a Violin Bow with Sensors. (since 1985)
 STEIM Sensor-Lab. Portable Mini-Computer which translates analogue Sensor data into MIDI Code. (1989)
 The Web, by Michel Waisvisz (1990)
 The Sweatstick, by Ray Edgar (1990)
 The Lady's Glove, by Laetitia Sonami (1991)
 Nic Collins: Midi Concertina (1992)
 Chromasone, by Walter Fabeck (1994)
 Mutantrumpet, by Ben Neill (2008)
 Stone with Nails, by Reyes Oteo (2009)

Software

 Lick Machine, by Frank Baldé (1989-1995). MIDI Macro-Controlling Software 
 LiSa, by Michel Waisvisz and Frank Baldé. Realtime software instrument for live sampling and realtime audio manipulation (since 1995)  LiSa info
 Big Eye, by Tom Demeyer. Video to MIDI converter (1995-2001)
 Image/ine, by Steina Vasulka and Tom Demeyer. Software instrument for realtime video manipulation (1996-2001)
 MIDI Joy, by Frank Baldé. Mapping game controllers to MIDI Code (1997-2002)
 JunXion, by Michel Waisvisz and Frank Baldé. Mapping game controllers, audio, video and sensor data to MIDI and OSC (since 2003) junXion info

STEIM touch philosophy 

As a headline for most of STEIM's instrumental developments it can apply that "Touch is crucial in communicating with the new electronic performance art technologies". As in traditional musical instruments, it is believed here that also in contemporary developments the physical touch of a musician contains essential aesthetic factors. These qualities tend to get lost in the non-realtime use of studio technology, in which the process of music production gets rather rational but bodily involved. The Touch philosophy — which can be considered as STEIM's interpretation of the widely used term interactivity —  theoretically subsumes several stages of STEIM's developments, from the analogue touchable "Crackle" surfaces in the 1970s  to today's experimental Gestural MIDI Interfaces.

Structure and people 

STEIM was a foundation whose primary financial support came from the Dutch ministry of Culture. It invited international artists in residence of all different musical and artistic styles and scenes. Aside from offering support in theoretic and practical development of contemporary musical instruments, STEIM also hosted in-house concerts, exhibitions and workshops. The work in progress of supported artists was presented during open studio events.

Artistic/managing directors

 Peter Schat, 1971-1973
 Michel Waisvisz, 1981-2008
 Dick Rijken, 2009-2020

Artistic guest directors

 George E. Lewis; Joel Ryan; Clarence Barlow, 1985 - ca. 1990
 Nicolas Collins, 1992-1995; 
 Steina Vasulka, 1996-1997; 
 Sally Jane Norman, 1998-2000; 
 Daniel Schorno; Netochka Nezvanova, 2001-2003
 Daniel Schorno, 2003-2004; 
 Jan St. Werner, 2004-2006; 
 Mazen Kerbaj; Atau Tanaka,  2006-2008;
 Tarek Atoui; Tina Blaine, 2008;
 Takuro Mizuta Lippit; 2008-2013

Artistic residency
 Kasia Glowicka (2011)
 Mark Trayle (2010)
 Henry Vega (2009/10)
 John Richards (2007)
 Marko Ciciliani (2006/2007)
 Benton C Bainbridge (1999)
 Peter Cusack (1996)
 Art Clay (1993)
 Tom Cora (1992) 
 Dominic Alldis (1988)

See also 
 Netochka Nezvanova - artistic guest director at STEIM, 2001-2003
 V2 Institute for the Unstable Media
 WORM, organisation in Rotterdam
 iii (Instrument Inventors Initiative), organisation in The Hague

References

External links 
 
crackle.org — Archive Site of Michel Waisvisz’ works
Spekle, Roland and Michel Waisvisz. “STEIM — A Reconstruction.” STEIM Writings.

Artist projects realised at STEIM
Golden, Barbara. “Conversation with Laetitia Sonami.” eContact! 12.2 — Interviews (2) (April 2010). Montréal: CEC.
Nowitz, Alex. “Voice and Live-Electronics using Remotes as Gestural Controllers.” eContact! 10.4 — Temps réel, improvisation et interactivité en électroacoustique / Live-electronics — Improvisation — Interactivity in Electroacoustics (October 2008). Montréal: CEC.
Scott, Richard. “Getting WiGi with It: Performing and Programming with an Infrared Gestural Instrument: A Case Study.” eContact! 12.3 — Instrument—Interface (June 2010). Montréal: CEC.

Music organisations based in the Netherlands
Inventors of musical instruments
Dutch music